LL may refer to:

 Ll or ll, a digraph that occurs in several natural languages

Arts and entertainment
LL, the production code for the 1967 Doctor Who serial The Evil of the Daleks
 Labyrinth Lord, a fantasy role-playing game
 Abbreviation for Love Live!, a music-oriented media mix project
 Leabhar Laighneach, a 12th-century Irish manuscript known in English as the Book of Leinster
 LL Cool J, American rapper-actor and Rock and Roll Hall of Fame inductee.

Brands, companies, and organizations
 Trade mark of the 1864 in Paris founded firm Léon & Lévy specialized in stereoscopic views and postcards
 Lincoln Laboratory, a US federally funded research and development center
 La Línea, a criminal organization based in Ciudad Juárez, Mexico
 Lumber Liquidators, a US retailer of hardwood flooring
 Bayer's Liberty Link gene, found in many modern food crops

Computing
 ll, a command to list files in long format in many Unix and Unix-like operating systems, as an alternative to ls -l
 LL parser, in computer science

Places
 LL, the ICAO prefix for airports in Israel
 LL postcode area, UK, also known as the Llandudno postcode area, covering north Wales
 Liberland, a micronation on the western bank of the Danube river, between Croatia and Serbia
 Miami Air International, an airline (IATA code: LL)

Other uses

'll, meaning will or shall in contractions 
 L (New York City Subway service), formerly designated LL
 Legis (Latin for laws) in law degrees
 Liquid Limit, in geotechnical engineering
 "Extra large", a clothing size typically abbreviated "XL"
Language Laboratory, a space for foreign language learning where students access audio or audio-visual materials, popular in Japan 
 Late Latin, the written Latin of Late Antiquity
 LearnedLeague, an online trivia website and competition
 LL is the standard abbreviation for the Lebanese pound
 Nintendo DSi LL, the Japanese name for the Nintendo DSi XL
 Nintendo 3DS LL, the Japanese name for the Nintendo 3DS XL
 New Nintendo 3DS LL, the Japanese name for the New Nintendo 3DS XL
 New Nintendo 2DS LL, the Japanese name for the New Nintendo 2DS XL
 Land line, telephone connection